The Circus Princess is a 1929 German silent film directed by Victor Janson. It is an adaptation of the operetta Die Zirkusprinzessin. It was shot at the Staaken Studios in Berlin. The film's sets were designed by the art directors Botho Hoefer and Hans Minzloff

Cast
In alphabetical order

References

Bibliography

External links

1929 films
Films of the Weimar Republic
Films directed by Victor Janson
German silent feature films
Films based on operettas
Circus films
German black-and-white films
Films shot at Staaken Studios